A rerebrace (sometimes known as an upper cannon) is a piece of armour designed to protect the upper arms (above the elbow). Splint rerebraces were a feature of Byzantine armour in the Early Medieval period. The rerebrace seems to have re-emerged in England, in the early 14th century. As part of the full plate armour of the Late Middle Ages and Renaissance the rerebrace was a tubular piece of armour between the shoulder defences (spaulder or pauldron) and the elbow protection (couter).

References

External links
Cleveland Museum of Art glossary of arms and armor

Western plate armour
Body armor